The  is a compact crossover SUV produced by the Japanese automaker Nissan since 2000. Since its introduction, the X-Trail is positioned below the truck-based Xterra and Pathfinder.

Since the third-generation model, the X-Trail became the same vehicle as the North American market Rogue. For the first time, the X-Trail became available with three-row seating as an option. It also marked a departure in terms of design from a rugged boxy look to a more urban-oriented crossover SUV design. The fourth-generation model introduced an e-Power series hybrid powertrain option, which became the sole option in Japan and Europe.

, the X-Trail is positioned between the smaller Qashqai – which the X-Trail shares platform with – and the larger Pathfinder in Nissan's global crossover SUV line-up.



First generation (T30; 2000) 

The T30 series X-Trail was unveiled at the September 2000 Paris Motor Show. It uses the Nissan MS/M&S/FF-S platform, shared with the Almera and the Primera. It entered production in October, and sales in Japan commenced in November 2000. In the United Kingdom and Australia, the X-Trail was launched in October 2001. In June 2003, Nissan gave the car an interior and exterior facelift, while also upgrading the 2.2-litre turbo-diesels with a variable turbocharger (2.2 DCi rather than the earlier 2.2 Di), producing  instead of the original . The external differences were slight, although the grille and the bumpers were redesigned and the Nissan logo was updated to the latest design.

The X-Trail's All-Mode 4x4 transmission transfer case enables the driver to select between 2WD, 4WD or 4WD Lock through an electronic switch on the dashboard. Nissan offered a hydrogen fuel cell model named the X-Trail FCV on lease to businesses. It was unveiled at the 60th Frankfurt Motor Show in September 2003, followed by the 37th Tokyo Motor Show in the following month.

While not marketed in the U.S., the X-Trail was sold in Canada for the model years of 2005 and 2006 until the 2007 calendar, and in Mexico since 2003.

Markets

Japan 
In Japan, the X-Trail was equipped with the QR20DE petrol engine, which produces , and the SR20VET petrol turbocharged engine, which produces .

In February 2001, Nissan launched a special edition AWD X-Trail equipped with the SR20VET petrol turbocharged engine. Named the X-Trail GT, it was offered only in Japan. This was the first SR20 Nissan ever produced which paired their famous high-flowing VE head (Variable Valve Lift - "VVL") with a turbo ("DET" internals also), in a transverse engine mounting configuration with AWD. It was only offered with a 4-speed automatic transmission and four-wheel-drive, model code is PNT30. The X-Trail GT has restyled grille and larger front bumper design, which was later used on the international market X-Trail.

On October 1, 2001, the St and Xt grades were added, followed by Stt and Xtt grades in October 2002.

The facelifted X-Trail was released in Japan on June 9, 2003.

United Kingdom 
In the United Kingdom, the first generation X-Trail was available in S, Sport and SE+ trim levels between launch and 2004. All models were equipped with full electric windows, electrically adjustable door mirrors (on SVE and T-Spec they were electrically folding also), climate control, single CD player, four airbags and remote central locking. There was also a Fat Face special edition in 2005, only for the United Kingdom, which was based on the Sports. They made 1,998 of them to celebrate the year Fat Face was set up. The trim levels were then revised to SE, Sport, SVE and T-Spec.

Australia 
In Australia, the X-Trail was available in standard ST, mid spec ST-S, high spec Ti and luxury spec Ti-L, with limited editions ST-X, ST-R, ST-S 40th anniversary models. All models were equipped with full electric windows, electric mirrors (electric folding on Ti-L), single CD player, two airbags and remote central locking. ST-S adds ST on sunroof and 16" alloy wheels. Ti adds ST on climate control, six disk CD player, fog lamps and 16" alloy wheels, and Ti-L adds Ti on leather and electric seats, sunroof, and optional DVD player. Limited edition ST-R adds ST on light emitting roof racks, with ST-S 40th Anniversary adding fog lamps to original ST-S.

Taiwan 
In 2003, Taiwanese Nissan distributor Yulon launched the Nissan X-Trail with a major design difference in the front end compared to the international version to fit the taste of the Taiwanese market. The design was done by Yulon Asia Technical Center under Yulon-Nissan Motors. The model was sold until 2006, when it received a minor facelift with new front bumper, grilles, headlamps, and LED tail lamps.

Due to the late facelift, Yulon-Nissan skipped the second generation X-Trail and continued the production of the facelifted Taiwanese Nissan X-Trail until 2008 and was replaced by the American imported first-generation Rogue. The X-Trail nameplate did not return until 2015 when the third generation Nissan X-Trail returned and continued to be domestically produced in Taiwan.

Philippines 
In the Philippines, Nissan Motors launched the X-Trail in 2003. The only available trim that time was the "200X". It is powered by Nissan's 2.0L QR20DE inline-four engine mated to a 4-speed automatic transmission. It featured fabric upholstery, remote keyless entry, a roof rail, 2DIN 6 CD with 4 speakers audio system, immobilizer, & collapsible steering column.

By 2004, Nissan introduced an all-new trim the "250X". The "250X" is now powered by Nissan's 2.5L QR25DE engine mated to a standard 4-speed automatic transmission. It received redesigned 16-inch rims, baby fender mirror, rear spoiler (4x2 variant only), MP3 ready with 6 speaker audio system, angel-eye foglights, among other features.

In 2007, Nissan introduced another new trim the "Tokyo Edition 250X". It is powered by the same 2.0L QR20DE now with CVTC paired to a standard 4-speed automatic transmission. It came with redesigned interior and grille, new color options, chrome door handles, Kenwood MP3 ready audio system, leather seats, automatic climate control and unique body stripes.

The T30 X-Trail continued to be sold with 2.0L engine alongside the T31 X-Trail with 2.5L engine until 2014.

Canada 
In 2006, Nissan Canada launched a Nissan X-Trail Bonavista Edition commercial, featuring a Nissan dealer speaking in an incomprehensible Newfoundland accent. The commercial itself backfired when Bonavista Mayor Betty Fitzgerald claimed it had portrayed people in Bonavista as people who cannot speak properly. To further expose the commercial's lack of linguistic authenticity, CBC News reported the sales rep was played by an actor from Cape Breton. That commercial was parodied by a local car dealer in St. John's, Newfoundland and Labrador, in a radio advert that takes shots at Ontario marketing companies and Premier Dalton McGuinty's "nondescript" personality.

Engines 
Available only in the Japanese market is the SR20VET that produces 206 kW (276 hp) and is used in the X-Trail GT. The Australian model is powered by a QR25DE 2.5-litre four-cylinder engine initially producing 132 kW (177 hp). From January 2006, the Australian spec engine was detuned to 123 kW (169 hp). Also available is the QR20DE four-cylinder engine, producing 103 kW (140 hp) or 110 kW (150 hp) with manual or automatic transmission. The best-selling engine option in the United Kingdom is the YD22DDTi, a 2.2-litre turbocharged common rail diesel.

Second generation (T31; 2007) 

The second generation X-Trail had its public debut at the Geneva Motor Show in March 2007, and went on sale in Japan in August 2007, Europe in the third quarter of that year, and Australia and Mexico towards the end of the year. Slightly larger than the previous model, it is based on the Renault–Nissan C platform. The second generation was not sold in the United States and Canada, where it was instead replaced by the Rogue.

In Japan, the X-Trail was initially offered with two engines, a 2.5 petrol and a 2.0 petrol powered by a CVT transmission and a 6-speed manual mode for the 2.5 engines. There were two trims available, the entry level S and top-of-the-line X model.

The X-Trail GT SR20VET petrol turbocharged engine was not offered in the second generation X-Trail, due to the 2005 Japan vehicle emissions control. In September 2008, the 20GT became available in Japan, equipped with the M9R, a 2.0-litre turbocharged common rail diesel engine developed jointly with Renault. This was the first diesel X-Trail offered in the Japanese domestic market. The previous 2.2-litre dCI was replaced with two 2.0-litre dCI (M9R) versions, offering  respectively.

The second generation was released in Malaysia in 2010, where it was fully imported from Indonesia. Only one variant was made available, which consisted of the MR20DE engine paired to a CVT transmission.

Facelift 
A facelifted second generation was released in Japan in July 2010. The Nissan X-Trail Platinum, with special features not seen on any other X-Trail, was released in a limited run of 200 vehicles for the United Kingdom in January 2012. The facelift version was made available in Malaysia in April 2013.

The second generation was replaced in October 2013, when the third generation X-Trail was unveiled in Japan. Only petrol engine variants were initially offered for Japan, with the diesel-engined second generation continuing to be available for the domestic market.

Dongfeng Fengdu MX6 

The Dongfeng Fengdu MX6 is a rebadged version of the X-Trail T31, featuring restyled front and rear bumpers produced by Zhengzhou-Nissan, and branded under the Dongfeng-Fengdu sub-brand of Dongfeng Motor Corporation. In March 2015, the model went on sale in China with 4WD and 2WD models available. The 2.0-litre MR20DE engine is standard along with a 6-speed manual or CVT gearbox. Trim levels are Standard, Excellence and Premium.

Third generation (T32; 2013) 

The third generation X-Trail was unveiled at the 2013 Frankfurt Motor Show. Based on an all-new CMF-CD platform shared with the Nissan Qashqai and Renault Koleos, the vehicle is a common successor for the second generation X-Trail and the Rogue that is offered in North America. It enables the model to be available in 190 countries around the globe, a projection Nissan made during its launch. It ditches the boxy SUV looks in favour of an urban crossover looks and softer lines inspired from the Hi-Cross Concept.

Although the new Nissan X-Trail has a larger surface area than the outgoing car, Nissan says weight has been reduced wherever possible. It features a tailgate dominated by plastic which saves 7 kg. Aerodynamics have also benefited from carefully shaped door mirrors as well as a spoiler that covers the exhaust box and rear panel.

The vehicle was also subsequently unveiled the 43rd Tokyo Motor Show 2013, and the 2014 Geneva Motor Show.

Production of the third-generation model continues in China alongside its successor, and it is sold as Nissan X-Trail Honor by Zhengzhou Nissan since 2021.

Markets

Asia 
Japanese sales commenced on December 11, 2013. Early models include MR20DD engine, and an option of two or three rows of seats. Variants include 20S, 20X, 20X Emergency Brake Package, 20X X-TREMER X and 20X Emergency Brake Package X-TREMER X. In April 2015, Nissan announced that an X-Trail hybrid with claimed fuel economy of 4.9 L/100 km was coming to Japan.

Chinese models went on sale in the end of March 2014.

On September 12, 2014, prior to the 22nd Indonesia International Motor Show, Nissan Motor Indonesia launched the third generation Nissan X-Trail. It is only available with three rows of seats at the time. It is manufactured in Purwakarta, Indonesia for domestic demand. The hybrid was unveiled at 23rd Gaikindo Indonesia International Auto Show and available only via special order. It was also launched in Thailand in November 2014 and it is manufactured in Samut Prakan, Thailand for Thai domestic demand.

In the Philippines, the third generation X-Trail was launched on 19 September 2014 during the 5th Philippine International Motor Show and is offered in two variants; 2.0L 2WD CVT and 2.5L 4WD CVT. The facelifted X-Trail was launched in the Philippines in September 2017. Engine choices remained the same as the pre-facelift model. It was also launched in Thailand in February 2019 where consumers had the choice between several variants powered by either a 2.5-litre petrol engine or a 2.0-litre hybrid powertrain.

The facelifted X-Trail was also launched in Indonesia on 18 July 2019 at the 27th Gaikindo Indonesia International Auto Show, and went on sale in August 2019. It is only available in VL trim and powered by a 2.5-litre petrol engine with CVT.

For the Malaysian market, the third generation X-Trail was launched in January 2015 with two variants: 2.0L 2WD (CVT) or 2.5L 4WD (CVT). Since launch, various editions have been made available namely Impul, Aero Edition and X-Tremer. All the various editions were/are sold alongside the regular X-Trail and like the regular X-Trail are available with either a 2.0L 2WD or 2.5L 4WD.

In March 2019, bookings were opened for the facelifted X-Trail with a media preview happening in the same month as well. The facelifted X-Trail has been available in Malaysia since April 2019, and available with four variants: 2.0L 2WD, 2.0L 2WD Mid, 2.5L 4WD and 2.0L Hybrid. All variants are only available with CVT.

Australia 
Australian models went on sale in March 2014 with both petrol and diesel variants: ST 2.0 2WD 6-speed Manual, ST, ST-L and Ti 2.5 CVT and TS 1.6 dCi 2WD CVT, TS 1.6 dCi 4WD CVT, TL 1.6 dCi 2WD CVT and TL 1.6 dCi 4WD 6-speed manual. On ST and ST-L 2.5, third row seats are available. European models went on sale in July 2014, with the only engine available being a Renault-sourced 1.6 dCi R9M diesel engine with CVT or 6-speed manual.

Facelift
For 2017, the Nissan X-Trail has been facelifted, with restyled headlights and tail lights which includes, restyled twin LED projector headlamps with High intensity discharge and LED Daytime Running Lights, which is now offered on SL trim levels with the Premium Package, while S, SV trim levels, and the SL trim levels without the Premium Package offers Halogen Headlamps with LED daytime running lights, and LED taillights are available on all trim levels. The 2.5L engine with 170 hp carries over from the previous model.

The new X-Trail went on sale in October 2016, and also has exterior and interior colours. A hybrid version of the vehicle premiered in January 2017 for the 2017 model year.

The 2017 model year hybrid features regenerative braking, pure drive hybrid emblems, energy monitor, hybrid battery status, under floor storage area replacing Divide-N-Hide@ Cargo System, a 2.0 litre four cylinder gasoline engine (power: 141 hp and torque: 141 lb-ft) and Xtronic CVT combined with an electric motor (power: 40 hp) and Lithium-Ion battery, for a combined power of 176 hp.

The Lithium-Ion battery is located below the thick flooring of the under floor cargo storage area. The X-Trail Hybrid is available in two trim levels, SV and SL, but the Nissan X-Trail Hybrid will not be available with third row seating (Family Package) and Divide-N-Hide@ Cargo System, due to the lithium-ion battery positioned under the boot.

Production
On 27 October 2016, Nissan Motor Corporation announced the production of the next X-Trail at NMUK. In February 2019, these plans were cancelled, with production planned to remain in Japan, citing concerns about Brexit related uncertainty. The declining popularity of diesel cars was another factor.

Nissan's Sunderland plant in the United Kingdom has been in operation since 1986, and has around 7,000 employees. Sunderland will continue to manufacture several Nissan models and the company reaffirmed its commitment to manufacture the new Qashqai for 2020 at the plant in the United Kingdom. Both Nissan and British officials confirmed that no jobs would be lost due to the modified arrangement, which will see production of the X-Trail moved to Kyushu.

Assembly of the X-Trail in Indonesia ended in February 2019 and replaced with an imported version from Japan, followed by Thailand which halted production in September 2020 without any replacement.

Fourth generation (T33; 2021) 

The fourth-generation X-Trail, designated under the model code T33, was unveiled on 19 April 2021 at the Auto Shanghai in China and went on sale on the same day, nearly a year after its Rogue counterpart was launched in North America in June 2020.

The T33 X-Trail is  taller,  wider,  shorter in length while the wheelbase is unchanged from the previous generation. The boot capacity is measured at 560L of storage capacity with the second row seats in place, a decrease of 5L.

For the e-Power model, the system combines the variable compression ratio 1.5-litre VC-Turbo three-cylinder petrol engine with the second-generation e-Power series hybrid powertrain. The second-generation hybrid system is said to be improved in terms of "power, smoothness, and quietness" compared to its predecessor. No diesel engine option will be offered for this generation.

Markets

Japan 
The fourth-generation X-Trail was launched in Japan on 20 July 2022. It is only available with the e-Power series hybrid powertrain. Available grade levels are S, X, and G, with optional "e-4ORCE" electric four-wheel drive, and optional three-row seating for the X 4WD grade. An off-road style accessories package and Autech version is also offered.

Australia 
The fourth-generation X-Trail was introduced in Australia in May 2022 with the 2.5-litre petrol engine. Available variants are ST, ST-L, Ti and Ti-L, with seven-seat all-wheel drive model offered as an option for the ST and ST-L variants while the Ti and Ti-L are five-seat all-wheel drive models.

Europe 
The fourth-generation X-Trail for the European market debuted in September 2022. Powertrain options include a 1.5-litre mild hybrid turbocharged petrol with variable compression ratio, and an e-Power series hybrid with the dual-motor electric all-wheel drive as an option for the latter.

Sales

References

External links

Official website (Japan)

X-Trail
Cars introduced in 2000
2010s cars
2020s cars
Compact sport utility vehicles
Crossover sport utility vehicles
Front-wheel-drive vehicles
All-wheel-drive vehicles
Hybrid electric cars
Hydrogen cars